Gavril Nagy (21 August 1932 – 4 December 2014) was a Romanian water polo player. He competed in the men's tournament at the 1956 Summer Olympics.

References

1932 births
2014 deaths
Romanian male water polo players
Olympic water polo players of Romania
Water polo players at the 1956 Summer Olympics
Sportspeople from Târgu Mureș